The Battle of Komorów, one of many clashes of the January Uprising, took place on June 20, 1863, near the village of Komorów, which at that time belonged to Russian-controlled Congress Poland. An insurgent unit under Zygmunt Jordan clashed with a detachment of the Imperial Russian Army. The battle ended in Russian victory.

On June 20, 1863, insurgent unit of Zygmunt Jordan crossed the Vistula, the river which marked the border between Galicia (Austrian Partition of Poland) and Congress Poland (Russian Partition). Polish insurgents were divided into two columns. One was attacked by Russian infantry near the village of Gace. Several Poles died, and the survivors retreated to Galicia.

Second column (350 infantry and 50 cavalry) clashed with Russians in the folwark of Komorów. Since the detachment of the Imperial Russian Army was much stronger and better equipped than the insurgents, Polish forces were pushed back towards the Vistula, and then to Galicia. The battle was terminated due to a thunderstorm.

All together, some 200 rebels were killed; some by the Russians, others drowned in the Vistula. 72 rebels were buried in a mass grave at a cemetery in Beszowa.

Sources 
 Stefan Kieniewicz: Powstanie styczniowe. Warszawa: Państwowe Wydawnictwo Naukowe, 1983. .

Conflicts in 1863
1863 in Poland
Komorow
June 1863 events